Liljeholmen is a Stockholm metro station in the city's southern Liljeholmen district. It is on the Red line (T13 and T14). The station is also an interchange with the Tvärbanan tramway, and a bus terminal. Liljeholmen metro station is also connected to Nybodadepån, a depot/garage for subway trains and buses, which is located in the south part of Liljeholmen.

Liljeholmen was opened on 5 April 1964 as part of the first stretch of the Red line, between T-Centralen and Fruängen, with a branch to Örnsberg.  It was a surface-level station with two platforms and only one exit at the southern part of the station, where it was a bus terminal. But since 2000, there is also a second exit towards the north part of Liljeholmen, which is connected to the Tvärbanan tramway station Liljeholmen. In the beginning of the 2000s (decade), the station was rebuilt to an indoor-station (though still above ground), with a new 3rd platform for trains towards Fruängen/Norsborg, which is connected to a new underground-bus-terminal, and above the station, new squares and houses were built.

References

External links
Images of Liljeholmen

Red line (Stockholm metro) stations
Railway stations opened in 1964